The Champion Stakes was an American Thoroughbred horse race run annually in August at the Monmouth Park Association's racetrack in Long Branch, New Jersey. Inaugurated in 1879, the Champion Stakes was open to horses of any age and was raced on dirt over a distance of one and one half miles (12 furlongs).

In 1891, the races at Long Branch had to be shifted to racetracks in New York when government legislation attempted to inhibit parimutuel wagering. The races were split between the Jerome Park Racetrack  in Fordham, Bronx and at the nearby Morris Park Racecourse at Westchester Village. The Monmouth Park Racing Association closed and the land sold after its operating license was revoked in 1893 and government legislation was enacted that banned parimutuel wagering.

In the final running of the Champion Stakes in 1892, Lamplighter set a new stakes and track record.

Records
Speed record:
 2:32.75 - Lamplighter (1892)

Most wins:
 2 - Firenze (1888, 1891)

Most wins by a jockey:
 4 - Jim McLaughlin (1880, 1881, 1884, 1887)

Most wins by a trainer:
 3 - James G. Rowe, Sr. (1880, 1881, 1884)
 3 - Matthew Byrnes (1888, 1990, 1991)

Most wins by an owner:
 4 - Dwyer Brothers Stable (1880, 1881, 1884, 1887)

Winners

Notes

External links
 The 1879 Champion Stakes
 August 10, 1892 New York Times article on Lamplighter's record win in the Champion Stakes

Horse races in New Jersey
Open middle distance horse races
Discontinued horse races
Monmouth Park Racetrack
Recurring sporting events established in 1879
Recurring sporting events disestablished in 1893
1879 establishments in New Jersey
1892 disestablishments in New Jersey